Basilius Suosaari (born Vasili Tichanoff, 4 April 1861 - 4 July 1939) was a Finnish-Australian politician and farmer. He was a Member of the Parliament of Finland for the Social Democratic Party in 1907-1908 and 1909-1910. 

Suosaari was born to a poor peasant family in Karelia, next to the Russian border. He was sold in a child auction for 13 years and worked later as a carpenter and a miner. In 1911, Suosaari emigrated to Australia where he settled Bli Bli, Queensland and ran a sugarcane farm. He was also active in a local utopian socialist community founded by the followers of Matti Kurikka.

Suosaari died in Bli Bli at the age of 78 in July 1939. He was buried to the Nambour Old Cemetery.

Basilius Suosaari was married to Anna Brita Nupponen (1869-1958) with 11 children. Their son Axel Suosaari (1908-1934) was a talented swimmer who was the Australian Champion of 100 yards freestyle swimming in 1930-1931. The Finnish Olympic Committee asked him to compete in the 1928 Summer Olympics, but Suosaari refused as he wanted to swim for Australia.

References 

1861 births
1939 deaths
Social Democratic Party of Finland politicians
Members of the Parliament of Finland (1907–08)
Members of the Parliament of Finland (1909–10)
Australian people of Finnish descent